The Criminal Lunatics Act 1800 (39 & 40 Geo 3 c 94) was an Act of the Parliament of Great Britain that required and established a set procedure for the indefinite detention of mentally ill offenders. It was passed through the House of Commons in direct reaction to the trial of James Hadfield, who attempted to assassinate King George III.

Background
Before 1800, if a defendant was acquitted on the grounds of insanity, he was simply allowed to go free because there was no law in place that allowed the government to detain him. If the judge presiding over the case thought that it would be dangerous to release the defendant and wanted him detained, a separate civil commitment hearing had to be held before the person could be incarcerated. In some cases, the authorities were able to use the Vagrancy Act of 1744 to confine criminals, but in the majority of cases the defendants were sent home or put into the care of their family.

Because a ruling in favour of a plea of insanity was basically equated with a verdict of not guilty, it was generally very difficult to obtain.  The consensus among law officials of the time was that madness had to be "obvious and overwhelming" before a plea of insanity would be accepted as a defence.  If it could be successfully argued that a lunatic committed a crime during a brief moment of sanity, then it was considered acceptable to convict the defendant, allowing the authorities to detain that person for the good of society.

Trial of James Hadfield
In May 1800, James Hadfield attempted to assassinate King George III at the Drury Lane Theatre. His statement at the time of his arrest was: "It is not over yet – there is a great deal more and worse to be done" which the prosecution used to argue that he was sane enough to plan the event and then carry it to fruition. Later, however, Hadfield changed his story and maintained that he had "not attempted to kill the King".

Because the intended victim was the King of Great Britain, James Hadfield was charged with treason.  This charge proved to be critical in determining the result of his case because it entitled him to several rights that were not given to criminals who had attempted to kill an ordinary person. First of all, the testimony of two witnesses, instead of just one, was needed to prove him guilty, since this was not an ordinary crime (The Treason Act 1800 was passed in July 1800 to make treason by attempting to kill the King subject to the same rules of evidence and procedure as a normal murder trial). Second and more importantly, he could demand that the court provide him with two defence counsels that would argue his case for him, instead of having to act as his own defence. Hadfield chose Thomas Erskine as his chief counsel. At the time, Erskine was regarded as the best lawyer in England.

Despite attempts by the prosecution to emphasise the standard strict criteria for madness, Erskine succeeded in convincing the judge and jury that Hadfield had only appeared to make an attempt on the King’s life in an effort to get himself killed, in accordance with his delusional belief that he must die at the hands of others.  The verdict of not guilty was secured.

Surprisingly, this result of the trial did not bring about a public outrage, possibly since no harm had actually come to the King. However, according to the Vagrancy Acts of 1714 and 1744, Hadfield could only be held until he had recovered his mind and the concern was that he would be released in a period of lucidity and make another attempt on the 
King’s life at a later date. In order to legally confine him, the Criminal Lunatics Bill of 1800 was hastily sent to the House of Commons.

The Act
No more than four days after the trial of James Hadfield, the prosecution proposed "A Bill for Regulating Trials for High Treason and Misprision of High Treason in certain cases, and for the Safe Custody of Insane Persons Charged with Offences". This bill included both what was to become the Criminal Lunatics Act 1800 and the Treason Act 1800, but the two sections were separated the day after the initial bill was presented to Parliament.

The terms of the Criminal Lunatics Act applied to people charged with treason, murder, or felony who were acquitted on the grounds of insanity or who appeared to be insane when apprehended, brought in for arraignment, or summoned for discharge due to a lack of prosecution.  The procedure for dealing with these people read as follows: "If [the jury] shall find that such person was insane at the time of the committing such offence, the court before whom such trial shall be had, shall order such person to be kept in strict custody, in such place and in such manner as to the court shall seem fit, until His Majesty’s pleasure shall be known."  In essence, the Criminal Lunatics Act required the detention of someone who had committed a crime in a bout of insanity rather than leaving it to the discretion of the judge and jury.

Repeal
The Act was repealed by the Statute Law (Repeals) Act 1981.  Currently, detention of mentally ill offenders is regulated by the Mental Health Act 1983, sections 35–41 and 47–49.

Section 1
This section was repealed for England and Ireland, by section 4 of the Trial of Lunatics Act 1883 (46 & 47 Vict c 38); and for Scotland by section 1 of, and Schedule 1 to, the Statute Law Revision Act 1948.

See also
 Mental health law
 Treason Act 1541
 Criminal Lunatics (Ireland) Act 1838

References
The Statutes Revised. Third Edition. HMSO. 1950. Volume 2. Page 313.

Further reading
Argent, Valerie (1978). Counter-Revolutionary Panic and the Treatment of the Insane: 1800  Middlesex University.
, p. 84.
 at p. 30.
, p. 121-122.
, p. 15–16.

Great Britain Acts of Parliament 1800
Legal history of England
Mental health legal history of the United Kingdom
English criminal law
Repealed Great Britain Acts of Parliament